"Good as I Was to You" is a song written by Billy Livsey and Don Schlitz, and recorded by American country music artist Lorrie Morgan.  It was released in December 1996 as the third and final single from her album Greater Need.  The song reached #4 on the Billboard Hot Country Singles & Tracks chart in May 1997.

Content
The song depicts a woman who, after learning her significant other (either her husband or boyfriend; no distinction is made in the song), confronts him in a restaurant, where he is dining with another woman. The woman angrily tells him all the good things she's done for him and expresses disgust and disappointment that he would respond by cheating on her. She then tells the other woman that she can have him and that she (the protagonist) no longer wants anything to do with her now ex.

Music video
The video for the song was directed by Michael Salomon. It shows Morgan pulling up in her car to a cafe on a very rainy day. She attempts to open the door, but doesn't once she looks through the window and sees her boyfriend with another woman. She eventually goes in and confronts him, and once he tries to apologize, she angrily pulls her arm back and walks away crying. She sings the last words of the song in her car before driving away. The other woman, having seen the drama unfold between Lorrie and her boyfriend, eventually gets up from the table herself and leaves, leaving the boyfriend with nobody. Lorrie is also shown performing the song while outside the cafe, at times banging on the window to show emotion.

Chart performance

Year-end charts

References

1996 songs
1997 singles
Lorrie Morgan songs
Songs written by Don Schlitz
Songs written by Billy Livsey
Song recordings produced by James Stroud
BNA Records singles
Music videos directed by Michael Salomon